Djent is a melodic tone of progressive metal characterized by its use of off-beat and complex rhythm patterns. Its distinctive sound is that of high-gain, distorted, palm-muted, down-tuned strings. The name "djent" is an onomatopoeia of this sound. A small group of people in the music community have mistakenly referred to it as a genre but it specifically refers to the unique sound played on the guitar. Newcomers to progressive metal commonly misunderstand this.

Development
Fredrik Thordendal, lead guitarist of Swedish band Meshuggah, is considered the originator of the djent technique. However, the band did not coin the term itself; In a 2018 interview by Rauta, Meshuggah guitarist Mårten Hagström apologised for the band's role in creating the "djent" style of guitar playing, calling it "a drunk misunderstanding".

Other bands important in the development of the style are Animals as Leaders, Periphery, Tesseract, and Textures.

It's popularity has grown rapidly, and members of the original online community, including the bands Chimp Spanner, Sithu Aye, and Monuments, have gone on to tour and release albums commercially. Other bands that often use djent include A Life Once Lost, Veil of Maya, Vildhjarta, and Xerath. Born of Osiris have also been described as being inspired by the djent movement. Furthermore, Hacktivist and DVSR are progressive metal bands that use rapping as primary vocal style with guitars playing the djent effects. Creating a new and unique style of music.

Characteristics
Djent as a style is characterized by progressive, rhythmic, and technical complexity accompanied by a use of polymetric groove. An example is the song "Cafo" by Animals as Leaders. It typically features heavily distorted, palm-muted guitar chords, syncopated riffs, and poly-meters alongside virtuosic soloing. Another common feature is the use of extended range guitars that are seven-string, eight-string, and nine-string, or even more strings.

Reception
Some members of the metal community have criticized the term "djent", either treating it as a short-lived fad, openly condemning it, or questioning its validity as a genre. However, bands such as Tesseract and Animals as Leaders have gained positive reviews, receiving awards and releasing highly-acclaimed albums. Post-metal band Rosetta is noted as saying, "Maybe we should start calling doom metal 'DUNNN'". In response to a question about "djent", Lamb of God vocalist Randy Blythe stated in 2011, "There is no such thing as 'djent'; it's not a genre." Deftones guitarist Stephen Carpenter similarly opined in 2016 that "I thoroughly can get djent, I even have great appreciation for the bands, and I mean Meshuggah is one of my favorite bands. But it's just not a genre. It's just metal." In an interview with Guitar Messenger, Periphery guitarist Misha Mansoor said:

In a later interview with Freethinkers Blog, Misha Mansoor stated that he felt djent had become "this big umbrella term for any sort of progressive band, and also any band that will [use] off-time chugs [...] You also get bands like Scale the Summit [who are referred to as] a djent band [when] 80% of their stuff sounds like clean channel, and it's all beautiful and pretty, you know [...] In that way, I think it's cool because it groups really cool bands together [...] We are surrounded by a lot of bands that I respect, but at the same time, I don't think people know what djent is either [...] It's very unclear." Later in the interview, he stated, "If you call us djent, that's fine. I mean, I would never self-apply the term, but at the same time, it's just so vague that I don't know what to make of it."

Tosin Abasi of Animals as Leaders takes a more lenient view of the term, stating that there are specific characteristics that are common to djent bands, and as a result the term can be legitimately used as a genre. While stating that he personally strives not to subscribe exclusively to any one genre, he makes the point that a genre is defined by the ability to associate common features between different artists. He says that in this way, it is possible to view djent as a genre describing a particular niche of modern progressive metal.

See also
 List of djent bands

References

 
Heavy metal genres
Progressive metal
1990s in music
2000s in music
2010s in music
British rock music genres